is a 1968 Japanese action film directed by Kazuo Mori. It stars Michiyo Yasuda. The film depicts the people of Yoshiwara from Onatsu's point of view. The Yoshiwara Story is one of the Hiroku series produced by Daiei.

Plot
Source: Onatsu became a prostitute in Yoshiwara to repay his father's debt. One day, Onatsu learns that her father was deceived by Ryōgokuya and forced to commit suicide.

Cast
 Michiyo Yasuda as Onatsu
 Masakazu Tamura as Naojirō
 Machiko Hasegawa as Daresore Dayu
 Yuko Hamada as Sasanoi
 Hōsei Komatsu as Chōhichi
 Tōru Emori as Miyokichi
 Ichiro Sugai as Negishi no Inkyo (Ryōgokuya)

Hiroku film series
 Hiroku Onna Rō (1968) directed by Akira Inoue.
 Hiroku Nagasaki Onna Rō (1968) directed by Shōwa Ota.
 Zoku Hiroku Onnagura (1968) directed by Kimiyoshi Yasuda.
 Hiroku Onna Dera (1969) directed by Tokuzō Tanaka.

References

External links
Yoshiwara Story at Kadokawa
 

1968 films
Films directed by Kazuo Mori
Jidaigeki films
Samurai films
1960s Japanese-language films
Films about geisha
Daiei Film films
1960s Japanese films